Howard Porter (August 31, 1948 – May 26, 2007) was an American professional basketball player.

Early life
Porter was born in Stuart, Florida. While in the 8th grade, he played on the varsity team at Stuart Training School, the high school for Martin County blacks. He attended Booker High School in Sarasota, Florida. The highlight of his high school career occurred in 1967, when he led Booker to the Florida Interscholastic Athletic Association Class A State Basketball Championship.

College career
Porter then played collegiately at Villanova University, where he was a three-time All-America selection. He took Villanova to the 1971 NCAA Championship Game, in which Villanova lost to UCLA 68–62. Porter was named the tournament's Most Outstanding Player after scoring 25 points in the final game. However, he was later ruled ineligible for the honor because he had signed a professional contract with the Pittsburgh Condors of the American Basketball Association during the middle of his senior year. To the present day, the MOP for the 1971 Final Four is listed as "*Vacated".

Professional career
Porter never played for the Condors, instead joining the NBA's Chicago Bulls in 1971. He played seven seasons in the NBA as a member of the Bulls, New York Knicks, Detroit Pistons, and New Jersey Nets.

His best professional season was in 1976–77 with Detroit, when he averaged 13.2 points and 5.9 rebounds, playing alongside fellow Villanova teammate Chris Ford.

Porter was nicknamed "Geezer" during his time at Villanova and had become a fan favorite at the Pistons' then-home, Cobo Arena.

Post-NBA life
Porter had retired from the NBA in 1978 at 29 years old in a career cut short by injuries, including a blood clot in his lungs, and a cocaine addiction, a significant problem in the 1970s NBA. He was arrested in 1985 and served six months in jail for drug possession. He entered a drug rehabilitation program in Minnesota in 1989, remained in the area, and in 1995 began working as a probation officer for Ramsey County.

2007 disappearance and murder
Howard Porter disappeared on May 18, 2007. He was found severely beaten in a Minneapolis alley in the early morning hours of May 19 and died on May 26 of injuries sustained during the assault.

Local police arrested a 33-year-old prostitute named Tanya Washington that Porter had solicited in connection with the murder. Washington was later released by police, who stated that there was not enough evidence to file charges against her. On September 4, police announced that they had arrested and charged Rashad Arthur Raleigh with Porter's murder, who had attacked the former NBA star in a robbery set-up. Raleigh is serving a life sentence for the crime.

Porter is interred at Washington Park Cemetery in Orlo Vista, Florida. He is survived by his three children, Ebony, Howard Jr. and Keelee.

References

1948 births
2007 deaths
2007 murders in the United States
20th-century African-American sportspeople
21st-century African-American people
African-American basketball players
All-American college men's basketball players
American men's basketball players
Basketball players from Florida
Centers (basketball)
Chicago Bulls draft picks
Chicago Bulls players
Deaths by beating in the United States
Detroit Pistons players
Male murder victims
Murdered African-American people
New York Knicks players
New Jersey Nets players
Parade High School All-Americans (boys' basketball)
People from Stuart, Florida
People murdered in Minnesota
Power forwards (basketball)
Probation and parole officers
Small forwards
Villanova Wildcats men's basketball players